Cerminara is a surname. Notable people with the surname include:

Gina Cerminara (1914–1984), American author
Kyle Cerminara, American wrestler and mixed martial artist